Mladen Milovanović (– 1823) was a Serbian merchant and politician who served as the prime minister of Serbia from 1807 to 1810 and again from 1813 to 1814. A notable voivode during the First Serbian Uprising, he briefly served as a representative in the cabinet of Matija Nenadović and was the first minister of defence from 1811 to 1813.

Biography
Born to Drobnjak clan ancestry, he became a wealthy merchant prior to the first uprising in goods trading. He had a strong influence on Karadjordje. After the defeat of Serbia, he went abroad, and in 1814 arrived in Khotyn, then part of the Imperial Russia, where he remained until 1821. Milovanović was one of the wealthiest people in Serbia of his time, which was a matter of controversy.

He was killed in 1823 while crossing over the Zlatibor and on the road to Montenegro, by order of Prince Miloš Obrenović. In April 1823, Prince Miloš gave the order in Kragujevac  to Serdar of Zlatibor Jovan Micić to escort Milovanović to Lim, and further transfer him to Montenegro. Micić's associates Leko and Simo Kovač killed him in the Očka mountain on Zlatibor during an alleged escape attempt by Milovanović.

His only daughter Jovanka Milovanović was married to politician Voivode Jakov Nenadović (1793-1867).

See also
 List of prime ministers of Serbia

References

18th-century Serbian people
19th-century Serbian people
People of the First Serbian Uprising
Prime Ministers of Serbia
Drobnjaci
Serbian revolutionaries
Serbian soldiers
Assassinated Serbian politicians
1760 births
1823 deaths
Serb volunteers in the Greek War of Independence
Defence ministers of Serbia